Aghcheh Mashhad (also Romanized as Āghcheh Mashhad; also known as Āghjeh Mashhad) is a village in Charuymaq-e Sharqi Rural District, Shadian District, Charuymaq County, East Azerbaijan Province, Iran. In the 2006 census its population was 181, comprising 34 families.

References 

Populated places in Charuymaq County